Linda Hardy (born 11 October 1973) is a French actress and model.

Life and career
Hardy won the title of Miss France in 1992, and represented her country at Miss Universe 1992, Miss World 1992, and Miss Europe 1992.

She then launched an acting career in French cinema, beginning with the 1999 film Recto-verso (here the article in French), which was followed by her role as Charlotte in the TV series H in 2000.

Internationally, her best-known role to date has been as the blue-haired, blue-teared, mutant-woman-turning-human, Jill, in the 2004 science-fiction film, Immortel (released in North America as Immortal). In the film, Hardy is dubbed by an English-speaking actress (Barbara Weber-Scaff), except for one piece of dialogue delivered in her French.

Another of her roles was in a 2006 film titled A House Divided, also known as Mount of Olives. The film tells the story of Romi (Eion Bailey), a Jewish American who falls in love with Joleh (Hardy), a Palestinian woman.

She has also had roles in the film Le Souffleur and the short film Dernière chance. In addition, she has made a number of appearances on television.

From 2010-2019, she appeared in a number of further films and TV series, as below.

Filmography

Theater

Personal life
She is mother of a boy, Andréa, born in 2010.

References

External links

 

1973 births
Living people
21st-century French actresses
French film actresses
French television actresses
Miss France winners
Miss Universe 1992 contestants
Miss World 1992 delegates
Actors from Nantes
20th-century French women